The New Look may refer to:

 The New Look, a fashion style created by Christian Dior in 1947
 The New Look (album), a 1966 album by Fontella Bass
 The New Look (policy), an American defense policy instituted during the Eisenhower administration
 The New Look (TV Series), an upcoming Apple TV+ series